Tersko-Orlovsky Mayak is a rural locality (an inhabited locality) in administrative jurisdiction of the closed administrative-territorial formation of Ostrovnoy in Murmansk Oblast, Russia, located on the Kola Peninsula, beyond the Arctic Circle, at an elevation of  above sea level. As of the 2010 Census, its population was 9.

Etymology
The locality gets its name from the nearby Tersko-Orlovsky Lighthouse.

References

Notes

Sources
Official website of Murmansk Oblast. Registry of the Administrative-Territorial Structure of Murmansk Oblast

External links

Rural localities in Murmansk Oblast
